Pawlet or Pawlett may refer to:

 Pawlet, Vermont, United States
 Pawlet (CDP), Vermont, the main village in the town of Pawlet
 Pawlett, Somerset, England